Time synchronization in North America can be achieved with many different methods, some of which require only a telephone, while others require expensive, sensitive, and rare electronic equipment. In the United States, the United States Naval Observatory provides the standard of time, called UTC(USNO), for the United States military and the Global Positioning System, while the National Institute of Standards and Technology provides the standard of time for civil purposes in the United States, called UTC(NIST).

ITU-R Standard Frequency and Time Signals 
A standard frequency and time signal service is a station that operates on or immediately adjacent to 2.5 MHz, 5 MHz, 10 MHz, 15 MHz, 20 MHz, and 25 MHz, as specified by Article 5 of the ITU Radio Regulations (edition 2012). The US service is provided by radio stations WWV (Colorado) and WWVH (Hawaii).

The methods below provide either Coordinated Universal Time (UTC), which is defined by Recommendation ITU-R TF.460, or the official U.S. implementation of UTC, officially labeled UTC (NIST).

Internet time sources 
Several different time synchronization protocols exist on the Internet, including:

GPS time synchronization 
GPS receiver requirements
 Minimum: GPS receiver that works with user chosen software; this requires some combination of GPGGA, GPRMC, GPZDA, GPGSA, and GPGSV sentences. This provides accuracy of between 1 and 2 seconds, and includes most, but not all modern GPS receivers.
 Better: USB GPS receiver with the NMEA 0183 GPZDA sentence sent at least once a second. The developer of the Windows software NMEATime2 recommends GPS units with the U-blox 7 receiver, and this software uses a control loop to analyze the text of the GPS timing sentence, and claims to achieve 1 ms accuracy with the technique.
 Better yet: RS-232 GPS receiver with the NMEA 0183 GPZDA sentence sent at least once a second, plus a 1PPS signal on DCD (1 μs accuracy possible with a real RS-232 port not on the USB bus; 1 ms possible with a RS-232 to USB adapter). The Garmin GPS 18x LVC appears to be the only such device that is generally available to consumers, but this then needs an external 5 V DC power source.
 Best: Higher accuracy is possible with a high-end GPS receiver designed for time signal use, but these are very expensive (around $1000), feature OCXOs (oven-controlled crystal oscillators), and often require special software and physical RS-232 ports not connected via a USB bus to achieve that accuracy.

Utility frequency 
In 2009 the Federal Energy Regulatory Commission made time error correction (TEC) of the power grid frequency mandatory. While TEC does not provide full synchronization (date and time) and synchronization is lost in case of a power outage it provides an inexpensive way to maintain high long term accuracy of synchronous clocks found in most household appliances. Once the initial time is set the power grid will typically maintain the accuracy within 10 seconds relative to UTC by adjusting frequency.

All time sources 
Several different organizations provide publicly accessible recorded voice time sources, including the NIST Telephone Time of Day Service, see speaking clock. Other sources include GPS, terrestrial radio time signals, and internet services, as listed below.

See also 

 Time signal
 Atomic clock
 Network time protocol
 Radio clock
 List of radio time signal stations
 WWV (radio station)
 WWVH
 WWVB
 Extended Data Services (XDS "Time-of-Day Packet")
 Standard frequency and time signal service
 Coordinated Universal Time
 List of UTC timing centers
 Time transfer
 Time and frequency transfer
 Time synchronization
 Time synchronization over radio

References

External links 
 Recommendation ITU-R TF.768, Standard Frequencies and Time Signals

Time signals
Synchronization
Time in North America
Timekeeping